The 1981 National Soccer League season was the fifty-eighth season under the National Soccer League (NSL) name. The season began in May, 1981 and concluded in October 1981 with the NSL Championship final where Hamilton Steelers defeated Toronto Italia in a two-legged series final. Hamilton would achieve a treble by also securing the regular-season title, and defeating Toronto Ukrainians for the NSL Cup.

Overview 
News of a potential Canadian national soccer league was confirmed when the Canadian Soccer Association (CSA) officially sanctioned a proposal from a group known as Sports Professionals International Inc. Meanwhile, on the National Soccer League (NSL) front the office of the league commissioner was established with league secretary Job Jones serving as the inaugural officeholder. A Canadianization policy was adopted by the league owners in an attempt to limit the ethnically associated clubs. The membership in the league remained identical to the previous season with the Serbian White Eagles, and Sudbury Cyclones departing. The league retained its American representative with Detroit Besa returning and replacing the Buffalo Blazers.

The Hamilton Italo-Canadians returned under the name Hamilton Steelers. Toronto Italia participated in the Toronto International Soccer Tournament against Barcelona S.C., S.L. Benfica, and Leeds United F.C.

Teams

Coaching changes

Final standings

References

External links
RSSSF CNSL page
thecnsl.com - 1981 season

1981–82 domestic association football leagues
National Soccer League
1981